"Love & Sex, Pt. 2" is a song by American recording artist Joe, featuring guest vocals from singer Kelly Rowland. Originally recorded by Joe and fellow R&B singer Fantasia Barrino for his tenth album Doubleback: Evolution of R&B (2013), a re-arranged version of the song, featuring a new instrumentation and vocals by Rowland, was included on Joe's follow-up album Bridges (2014). Written by Alvin Garrett, Gerald Isaac, and Derek "D.O.A." Allen, with production helmed by the latter, it was released as the lead single from the Bridges album. It reached the top five on the US Billboard Adult R&B Songs chart.

Music video
A music video to accompany the release of "Love & Sex, Pt. 2" was directed by Billie Woodruff.

Track listing

Charts

Release history

References

2014 singles
Kelly Rowland songs
2014 songs
Joe (singer) songs